Joseph Jun-hee Kahn (born Ahn Jun-hee, ; October 12, 1972) is a South Korean-American film and music video director. Kahn has worked with various artists such as  Britney Spears, Taylor Swift, Eminem, Backstreet Boys, Jennifer Lopez, Lady Gaga, Kylie Minogue, Sun Ho, Samantha Mumba, Shakira, Aaliyah, Dr. Dre, Snoop Dogg, Chris Brown, Kelly Clarkson, Ava Max, Mariah Carey, Imagine Dragons, Christina Aguilera, 50 Cent, Destiny's Child, George Michael and Jonas Brothers.

Early life
Kahn was born Ahn Jun-hee in Busan, South Korea. His family spent part of his childhood there and in Livorno, Italy until moving to Jersey Village, Texas, a suburb of Houston, when Joseph was seven. After graduating from Jersey Village High School in 1990, Kahn went to New York University's Tisch School of the Arts but dropped out after a year due to inability to pay tuition. Returning to Houston, Kahn worked at a movie theater before beginning to direct hip-hop music videos.

Music video career
In 2003, Kahn won his first Grammy for Eminem's "Without Me" video which also won the MTV VMA's Best Video of the Year, as well as Best Direction. His video for Katy Perry "Waking Up in Vegas" won the MVPA 2009 Best Video of the Year.

Kahn's usage of Japanese pop culture in music videos first began with Janet Jackson's "Doesn't Really Matter" video. The video was also the most expensive video Kahn has directed and is among the most expensive of all time, costing over $2.5 million.

In 2014, Kahn was given The Icon Award by the UK Music Video Awards.

In 2015, Kahn directed MTV's choices for Video of the Year, Best Pop Video, Best Female Video, and Best Collaboration for multiple videos from American singer-songwriter Taylor Swift's fifth studio album 1989, including "Blank Space", "Bad Blood", "Wildest Dreams" and "Out of the Woods" and her sixth studio album Reputation, including "Look What You Made Me Do", "...Ready for It?", "End Game", and "Delicate". He won the Grammy Award for Best Music Video of 2015 for Swift's single "Bad Blood" featuring Kendrick Lamar.

In 2017, Kahn won the American Country Music Awards Video of the Year for "Forever Country."

In 2019, Kahn collaborated with Ava Max for the "Torn" music video, and directed a new music video for Mariah Carey's 1994 hit, "All I Want for Christmas Is You".

In 2022, Kahn directed a music video for Chris Brown's lead single "Iffy" of his upcoming album Breezy.

Film career
Kahn also directed the 2004 action film Torque starring Ice Cube. In May 2007, it was announced that he would direct an adaptation of William Gibson's science fiction classic Neuromancer for producer Peter Hoffman. On May 7, 2010, Fangoria reported that Vincenzo Natali, the director of Cube and Splice, had taken over directing duties and will also rewrite the screenplay. In 2011, Kahn directed the low-budget, self-financed horror comedy Detention. After winning a number of audience favorite awards on the film festival circuit, Detention was picked up for theatrical distribution by Sony for a release in 2012.
In July 2016, test footage for the DC Comics character Swamp Thing was released which was directed by Kahn for the potential Justice League Dark film. Kahn's latest film is Bodied, a satirical black comedy about racial tensions in the world of battle rap. The film was produced by Eminem and premiered at the 2017 Toronto International Film Festival, where it won the People's Choice Award in the Midnight Madness section.

Filmography

References

External links 
 
 
 Joseph Kahn at Director File 2
 Joseph Kahn Videography at Clipland.com

1972 births
American film directors of Korean descent
American music video directors
Film directors from Los Angeles
Film directors from Texas
Grammy Award winners
Jersey Village High School alumni
Living people
People from Busan
People from Houston
People from Livorno
People from Pacific Palisades, California
South Korean emigrants to the United States
Tisch School of the Arts alumni